Heinz Wozniakowski (24 December 1924 – 1963) was a German football player. He began his career with Breslauer FV 06 and FC 93 Mülhausen. After the Second World War he joined BSG KWU Erfurt (later renamed into Turbine and finally Rot-Weiß Erfurt) in the East German Oberliga, at the time one of the best sides in the country. In 1951 Wozniakowski left East Germany together with his teammate Winfried Herz, to join the West German club Eintracht Braunschweig. Wozniakowski went on to play 7 seasons for Eintracht Braunschweig, until he retired in 1958.

Honours

Club
DDR-Oberliga runner-up: 1950-51
FDGB-Pokal runner-up: 1949-50

References

1924 births
1963 deaths
Sportspeople from Wrocław
German footballers
Eintracht Braunschweig players
FC Rot-Weiß Erfurt players
FC Mulhouse players
DDR-Oberliga players
Association football forwards
People from the Province of Lower Silesia